The Pennsylvania Department of Agriculture (PDA) is a cabinet-level agency in Pennsylvania. The department's purpose is to support a sustainable and safe supply of food and agricultural products; be good stewards of the land and natural resources; promote the viability of farms; protect consumers; and safeguard the health of people, plants, animals and the environment.

The department is under the direction and supervision of the Secretary of Agriculture, who is appointed by the Governor of Pennsylvania with the approval of the Pennsylvania Senate. The current Secretary of Agriculture, Russell Redding, was appointed by Governor Tom Wolf in January 2015 and confirmed in May 2015.

Secretaries of Agriculture
 Russell Redding (Confirmed May 2015)
 George Greig (Confirmed May 2011)
 Russell Redding (Confirmed December 2009)
 Dennis C. Wolff (Confirmed May 2003)
 Samuel E. Hayes Jr. (Appointed May 1997)
 Charles C. Brosius (Appointed March 1995)
 Boyd E. Wolff (Appointed January 1987)
 Richard E. Grubb (Appointed May 1985)
 Penrose Hallowell (Appointed January 1979)
 Kent D. Shelhamer (Appointed February 1977)
 Raymond J. Kerstetter (Appointed March 1976)
 James A. McHale (Appointed January 1971)
 Leland H. Bull (Appointed January 1963)
 William L. Henning (Appointed January 1955)
 W. S. Hagar (Appointed November 1954)
 Miles Horst (Appointed January 1953)

Organization
The department is under the direction and supervision of the secretary of Agriculture, who is appointed by the governor of Pennsylvania. The secretary is assisted in managing the department by an executive deputy secretary, two deputy secretaries and a special deputy secretary. The department is subdivided into program bureaus, each headed by a bureau director. Bureaus are further subdivided into divisions.

Secretary of Agriculture
Executive Deputy Secretary
Deputy Secretary for Agriculture and Consumer Protection 
Farmland Preservation Bureau
Agricultural Conservation Easements Division
Land Use and Natural Resources Division
Farm Show Bureau
Show Management Division
Operations and Maintenance Division
Safety and Security Division
Animal Health and Diagonistic Services Bureau
Animal Health Division
Regulation and Compliance Division
Veterinary Laboratories Division
Food Safety and Laboratory Services Bureau
Food Safety Division
Milk Sanitation Division
Laboratories Division
Eggs, Fruits and Vegetables Inspection Division
Ride and Measurement Services Bureau
Amusement Ride Division
Weights and Measures Division
Deputy Secretary for Marketing and Economic Development 
Plant Industry Bureau
Plant Protection Division
Health and Safety Division
Agronomic and Reguibak Services Division
Market Development Bureau
Livestock Marketing and Grading Division
Economic Development Division
Agricultural Marketing Division
Food Distribution Bureau
Federal Commity Division
Food Assistance Division
Field Operations Division
Special Deputy Secretary for Dog Law Enforcement
Dog Law Enforcement Bureau
Administrative Services Bureau
Office Services Division
Contracting and Procurement Division
Human Resources Office
Regional Offices
Information Technology Services Office

Incidents

In 2014, the Pennsylvania Department of Agriculture caused a seed-lending library to shut down and promised to curtail any similar efforts in the state. The lending library, hosted by a town library, allowed gardeners to "check out" a package of open-pollinated seed, and "return" seeds kept from the crop grown from those seeds. The Department of Agriculture said that this activity raises the possibility of "agro-terrorism", and that a Seed Act of 2004 requires the library staff to test each seed packet for germination rate and whether the seed was true to type. In 2016 the department reversed this decision, and clarified that seed libraries and non-commercial seed exchanges are not subject to the requirements of the Seed Act.

See also
 List of Pennsylvania state agencies

References

External links
Pennsylvania Department of Agriculture

State agencies of Pennsylvania
State departments of agriculture of the United States
Government agencies established in 1895
1895 establishments in Pennsylvania